The Michigan Times, the student newspaper of the University of Michigan–Flint, was founded in 1959. It is casually referred to on and around campus as "The M-Times."

Starting in the fall of 2010, The Michigan Times went from being published biweekly, to weekly. The transition also included cutting the number of pages in the newspaper in half, with a four-page A section and a two-page B section (M2).

About The Michigan Times
The Michigan Times has had notables such as filmmaker Michael Moore and American Idol finalist LaKisha Jones on its staff.

The Michigan Times has a print run of 3,000 papers per issue and is printed weekly.

The Michigan Times website was launched in 2003. It marked the first time the newspaper had been available in a digital format.

Awards and publicity
In 2004, music writer John McKay received 2nd prize statewide from the Michigan Press Association for his review of popular rock group The All-American Rejects' debut album. It is the first statewide recognition for the publication.

In November 2005, national syndicated radio talk show host Rush Limbaugh read a Michigan Times article on his show as part of his "Feminist Update." The article, "MSU professors link hunting with sexual violence" was written by Page W.H. Brousseau IV taken from the November 7, 2005 issue, and focused on a study by Michigan State University professors linking sexual violence with bow hunting.

In 2008, The Michigan Times was awarded nine times in Division III by the Michigan Press Association. These awards included:

Journalist of the Year — John McKay (First place)
Deadline Story — Mike Stechschulte (First place)
Investigative Reporting — Doug Snyder (First place)
Special Ad Section — Doug Snyder and Mike Stechschulte (First place)

Also in 2008, Sports Illustrated published a link to Managing Editor John McKay's story, titled "Flint, Michigan football fans go blue over tickets."

In 2010, The Michigan Times won two MPA awards. Kaitlin Doyle placed second for News Page Design and Amanda Emery placed second in Original Cartoon - Editorial or Entertainment (Shifty Pig).

References

External links
 

Publications established in 1956
Student newspapers published in Michigan
University of Michigan mass media
1956 establishments in Michigan